KWPZ (106.5 MHz) is a commercial FM radio station broadcasting a Contemporary Christian radio format, with an emphasis on praise and worship music.  Some Christian talk and teaching shows are also heard and some programming is shared with sister station 105.3 KCMS in Seattle.  Licensed to Lynden, Washington, United States, the station serves Northwest Washington and Southern British Columbia including Greater Vancouver, Victoria and the Fraser River Valley.  The station is currently owned by Crista Ministries. BBM Canada lists the station in the Vancouver ratings.

KWPZ broadcasts in HD Radio. 
KWPZ HD1 is a simulcast of "PRAISE 106-5".
KWPZ HD2 is known as "Sky Country Radio".

Programming
Programs broadcast on KWPZ include:

 Adventures in Odyssey
 Focus on the Family
 Insight for Living
 Back to the Bible
 Grace to You
 Turning Point
 Family Life Today
 Extreme Praise: "Praise for a New Generation"
 A New Beginning
 Paws & Tales

References

External links

WPZ
Contemporary Christian radio stations in the United States
Lynden, Washington
Radio stations established in 1960
1960 establishments in Washington (state)